Hardy palms are any of the species of palm (Arecaceae) that are able to withstand brief periods of colder temperatures and even occasional snowfall. A few palms are native to higher elevations of south Asia where true winter conditions occur, while a few others are native to the warmer parts of the temperate zone in North America. A few of these temperate climate palms can tolerate hard freezes with little or no damage. Many of these "hardy " species can be cultivated in warmer parts of temperate climates.

The cold hardiness of palms varies by species. Members of the above palms and other genera are sometimes grown in areas where they are not truly hardy, overwintering with the aid of various kinds of artificial protection.

Fan palms

The fan palms (Arecaceae tribe Corypheae; palms with fan-shaped leaves) include all of the hardiest palms.
Windmill Palms (Trachycarpus fortunei, T. takil) – is considered the most cold hardy arborescent palm in the world. These tough species are native to eastern China, Myanmar, and the Himalaya mountains where severe (though brief) winter conditions occur. It is also tolerant of low summer temperatures. Mature Trachycarpus trees have been successfully grown in high latitude locations as far north as 58°N in northern Scotland and Stavanger Norway (59° N). Mature specimens can also be found in the southern coast of Ireland, the southern coast of England, southwestern Canada (in the city of Vancouver and on Vancouver Island),  Southern Switzerland (Ticino). Trachycarpus is also grown extensively in Japan, Australia, and New Zealand. In the United States Trachycarpus is cultivated along the Pacific coast and as far north as Washington State and along the Atlantic coast as far north as southern Connecticut. Large mature specimens can be found from Maryland south to Georgia, though numbers decline toward southern Georgia south toward Florida. Across the interior of the United States, there are reports of long term specimens that have survived north to the Ohio River, with several long term plantings in the higher elevations of Tennessee and western North Carolina. It is rated as winter hardy to USDA zone 7. It appears that areas west of the Mississippi River (the southern Plains) may be too hot in summer for successful long term cultivation. Thus, Windmill palms are the most cold and cool summer hardy of all the palms, although absolute minimum temperature may be exceeded by needle Palms, Sabal minor, as well as very brief nighttime cold exposure to desert palms. 

This palm thrives in any sub-tropical environment. You will see this palm tree in states such as: Alabama, Arizona, Arkansas, California, Georgia, Louisiana, Mississippi, Nevada, and Texas. During late spring the tree will produce small, fragrant flowers. This palm produces sharp thorns on the frond stalks, so one must take proper precautions while pruning.

Mediterranean Fan Palm (Chamaerops humilis) – The only palm native to southern Europe besides the Cretan Date Palm, and very drought-tolerant. Despite the fact that this palm is less hardy than many palms listed here, it has the northernmost native habitat. It is rated as winter hardy to USDA zone 8. It is found in abundance across most of southwestern Europe and northwestern Africa. It is a very slow-growing plant. The blue form of the species (cerifera), native to high elevations of the Atlas Mountains, has recently been introduced into the trade and early reports indicate that it may be  or more degrees hardier than the green form.

Needle Palm (Rhapidophyllum hystrix) – This clustering and usually trunkless palm is native to the subtropical southeastern United States, from central Florida to Georgia, Mississippi, South Carolina and Alabama in the United States. It is considered hardy to -23.3 C (-10 F), and is cultivated along the East Coast from Florida to southern Massachusetts, and along the West Coast from California to Seattle. They have proven hardy in the Tennessee valley region and up into the lower Ohio Valley.

Mazari Palm (Nannorrhops richtiana) – This palm, native to the dry, mountainous terrains of northern Pakistan, Afghanistan, Iran and surrounding regions, is also thought to be extremely cold hardy (perhaps to about ), though also requiring hot summers and dry soils. However, due to its limited availability in cultivation, not much is known about this palm. Mazari Palm is not easy to grow, perfect drainage and full sun are required for this palm to survive. This palm will not tolerate wet freezes.

This bushy palm grows in abundance within wetlands and subtropical grasslands of central and northern Florida. Extract from Saw Palmetto is often used to treat problems with the prostate.

Sabal palms (palmettos; 13 species) – These palms are native to the southeastern United States, Mexico, Central America, and the Caribbean. The Cabbage Palmetto (Sabal palmetto), the state tree of both Florida and South Carolina, and is widely cultivated along the south Atlantic and Gulf of Mexico coast of the United States, and needs hot and humid summers to grow. Large and older specimens can be found from southern Virginia south to Florida and west to Texas. There are a few documented smaller specimens of Sabal palmetto {cabbage palm} growing in zone 7b in southern Maryland, Delaware, and coastal Connecticut in the city of Bridgeport. The Mexican Palmetto (Sabal mexicana) is a close relative of the Cabbage Palmetto, native to southern Texas and northern Mexico.

Dwarf Palmetto (Sabal minor) is considered hardy to USDA zone 6b, like the needle palm. Endemic to the swamps and lowlands of the south Atlantic and Gulf of Mexico coast of the United States, it can stand long periods of heat and drought. Sabal minor is successfully cultivated across the entire southern United States below 35 latitude, and up the East Coast to 41 latitude and up the West Coast to 45 latitude. 

Caranday palm (Trithrinax campestris) is a South American arecaceae palm native of Uruguayan and northeastern Argentine sabanas. It is a very rustic palm that grows in arid, well drained, rocky soils. Its distinctive features are its compact shape, short green to grayish foliage, and trunk fully hidden by dry dead branches (coat) remaining from several previous seasons. It is very resistant to drought, and -9 °C/-15 °C temperatures when not in growing season, although it tends to shed its leaves in these conditions. It is one of the most cold-hardy palms in the world, because it also grows in the mountains of Sierras de Córdoba.

It is sometimes grown in containers, or planted as short-term specimens in areas where it is not quite hardy. Mexican Washingtonia (W. robusta) is somewhat less hardy, native to northern Mexico (Baja California Peninsula).

Livistona australis – It is native to southeastern Australia.

Pinnate-leaved palms
Few palms with pinnate leaves tolerate much frost. They belong to several tribes of the Arecaceae, with the species listed here belonging to Tribe Areceae (Chamaedorea), Tribe Cocoseae (Butia, Jubaea) and Tribe Phoeniceae (Phoenix).

This palm does not perform well in hot, humid tropical climates.
Butia Palm or Jelly Palm / Pindo Palm (Butia odorata (syn. B. capitata Hort.)) – With Jubaea, possibly the hardiest known pinnate-leaved palm. B. odorata is a palm native to Brazil and Uruguay. It is easily identifiable with beautiful pinnate leaves that arch outwards from a thick stout trunk. It is commonly grown on the East Coast of the United States as far north as Virginia Beach, Virginia and Portland and Seattle on the West coast. It thrives in humid subtropical climates. This tree is commonly known as the "jelly palm" because of the sticky, edible, date-like fruit it produces, which is used in many South American countries to make jelly.
Butia eriospatha - Woolly Jelly Palm - Though it maybe more cold tolerant, in N. America it is not found in cultivation as much as B. ordorata. The weather is more similar to N. America's Pacific Northwest, with wet winters and cool summer days. 
Chamaedorea microspadix and Chamaedorea radicalis – the hardiest known species in the genus Chamaedorea.

In North America mature specimens can be found as far north as Gold Beach, Oregon (42.5º N) on the West Coast, and Wilmington, North Carolina (35.2 N) on the East Coast. This palm is one of the most commonly grown palms in the world. Well adapted to low humidity and little watering, this palm is used as an ornamental in both Mediterranean climates and desert climates. In more humid climates, these trees will often be seen with sword ferns sprouting just beneath the crown.
Cretan Date Palm (Phoenix theophrasti) – Another species of Phoenix which shows similar frost tolerance, or it may be even hardier. Native to Crete and southwest Turkey, but has not been adequately tested for hardiness. 
This palm is one of the staple plants of the Middle East for its versatility and edible fruit.
Manmade hybrid between the Butia palm and Queen palm. One of the hardiest feather palms. It combines the hardiness of the Butia palm with the fast-growing, tropical fronds of the Queen palm. Mature specimens are quite rare due to the difficulty in producing this palm and the characteristics and cold tolerance of the palm is variable with each specimen. Many of them resemble coconut palms. 
At this altitude it tolerates occasional frosts for short periods of time.	
Ceroxylon alpinum – It is native to the Andes.
Archontophoenix cunninghamiana –  native to Australia, and 
Beccariophoenix alfredii High plateau coconut palm are slightly frost Hardy Coconut palm lookalikes. 
Howea forsteriana – It is native to Lord Howe Island in Australia.
Rhopalostylis sapida – It is native to New Zealand. It is southernmost palm in the world found as far south as 44°S.
Caryota species – They are generally considered tolerant to occasional frosts.
Dypsis decipiens – It is native to Madagascar.

Queen palm - Adult specimens can even survive up to -6 °c.

Plants referred to as palms
Some plants used in subtropical landscaping in temperate climates like much of Europe, northern China/Japan, Korea, the northern USA, New Zealand, etc. that are commonly referred to as "palms", but are not palms, i.e. not members of the Arecaceae family, include: Aloidendron barberae, Beaucarnea recurvata, Cordyline australis, Cordyline indivisa, Cycas revoluta, Dasylirion, Cyathea australis, Cyathea capensis, Cyathea cooperi, Cyathea dealbata, Cyathea medullaris, Dicksonia antarctica, Dicksonia squarrosa, Dioon angustifolium, Dioon edule, Encephalartos, Macrozamia communis, Macrozamia johnsonii, Macrozamia riedlei, Mahonia eurybracteata, Mahonia oiwakensis,  Musa basjoo, Musa sikkimensis, Pseudopanax ferox, Rhus typhina, Xanthorrhoea, Yucca aloifolia, Yucca gigantea, Yucca rostrata and Zamia integrifolia.

Hardiness
In general, hardy palms can only tolerate brief periods with temperatures in the range . As such, this generally limits hardy palm cultivation and long term specimens to zone 7a or higher. Some hardy palms can be cultivated in areas with low temperatures slightly below this range when given wind sheltering (planted on the south side of a building). In the US, hardy palm cultivation is generally attempted from USDA zones 6b/7a southward.

In very cold winter areas below zone 6b, cold hardy palms have been cultivated by partially (or completely) covering plants with mini-green house coverings and wraps. Some garden enthusiasts in severe cold winter areas have gone as far as heating the interiors of these winter enclosures. As such, there are occasional reports of hardy palms be cultivated in areas with severe winters with low temperatures below .

Gallery

References

External links
Palm Trees in Russia
Højgaard, A., Jóhansen, J., & Ødum, S. (1989). A century of tree planting on the Faroe Islands. Ann. Soc. Sci. Faeroensis Supplementum 14.
[Cold Hardy Palms in Ohio

Hardy
Trees by climate
Lists of trees
Garden plants